Sar Tang-e Deh Kohneh Hamidabad (also Romanized as Sar Tang-e Deh Kohneh Ḩāmīdābād; also known as Āb Zār, Sar Tang, and Sar Tang-e Āb Zā) is a village in Pataveh Rural District, Pataveh District, Dana County, Kohgiluyeh and Boyer-Ahmad Province, Iran. At the 2006 census, its population was 38, in 7 families.

References 

Populated places in Dana County